Xylotrupes meridionalis, commonly known as forked horns rhinoceros beetle, is a species of rhinoceros beetle found in India and Sri Lanka.

Description
Male has prolonged anterior legs whereas female has normal anterior legs. Basal joints of posterior tarsi are cylindrical in shape. Propygidium lack a stridulatory area. Male has a single thoracic horn. Elytra coriaceous. Male has large tambour shaped phallobase. Adult beetles feed on young bark, seedlings, shoots, and twigs. Host plants included: Acacia mearnsii, Hevea brasiliensis and Toona australis.

Subspecies
Two subspecies recognized.

 Xylotrupes meridionalis meridionalis Prell, 1914 – India
 Xylotrupes meridionalis taprobanes Prell, 1914 – Sri Lanka

References

Dynastinae
Insects of Sri Lanka
Insects of India
Insects described in 1914